Mount Sagmatas is a mountain of Boeotia, Greece. In antiquity, it was called Hypatos and hosted a temple of Zeus. It bounded the Theban plain on the east, towering over the town of Glisas, and the river Thermodon ran down it on course to Teumessus.

References

Geography of ancient Boeotia
Mountains of Greece